John Bergstrom (born March 3, 1973) is an American music critic and journalist.

Career
He is best known for his features and reviews on the international webzine PopMatters. He is also a contributor to Trouser Press. He has also written for the alternative weekly newspaper Shepherd Express.

Personal life
Bergstrom lives in Madison, Wisconsin with his wife and two children.

References

External links 
Reviews and features by John Bergstrom at PopMatters

American music critics
1973 births
Living people